Pliotrema annae, Anna's sixgill sawshark, is a sawshark in the family Pristiophoridae found in Zanzibar (Western Indian Ocean).

This shark has barbels which are located roughly half way from the rostral tip to the mouth. Its rostra are constricted between barbel origin and the nostrils.

References 

Pristiophoridae
Fish described in 2020